Melanopolia gripha is a species of beetle in the family Cerambycidae. It was described by Karl Jordan in 1894, originally under the genus Monohammus. It is known from Gabon, Cameroon, and the Democratic Republic of the Congo.

References

Lamiini
Beetles described in 1894